Stillwater Dam may refer to:

Stillwater Dam (Maine), in Old Town, Penobscot County
Stillwater Dam (Pennsylvania), in Susquehanna County
 Part of Stillwater Mill museum